Van der Walt is an Afrikaans surname. Notable people with the surname include:

 Dawie van der Walt (born 1983), South African golfer
 Deon van der Walt (1958–2005), South African opera singer
 Eduan van der Walt (born 1987), South African rugby union player
 Jaco van der Walt (born 1994), South African rugby union player
 Lucien van der Walt (born 1972), South African sociologist, labour educator
 Nardus van der Walt (born 1992), South African rugby union player
 Piet van der Walt (born 1966), Namibian businessman and politician
 Philip van der Walt (born 1989), South African rugby union player
 Tjaart van der Walt (born 1974), South African golfer
 Wimpie van der Walt (born 1989), South African rugby union player

Afrikaans-language surnames
Surnames of Dutch origin